Gwilym Wyn Jones, CBE (12 July 1926 – 23 October 1993) was a British colonial administrator. He was Governor of Montserrat from 1977 to 1980.

References 
 

Governors of Montserrat
1926 births
1993 deaths